Michael Francis Lovell Cocks, Baron Cocks of Hartcliffe, PC (19 August 1929 – 26 March 2001) was a British Labour Party politician. He was the member of parliament for Bristol South from 1970 to 1987, and was the Labour Party's chief whip from 1976 to 1985.

Early life
Cocks was born in Leeds, and was educated at George Watson's College, Edinburgh, and Silcoates School, Wakefield. After obtaining a BSc at Bristol University he became a geography teacher and later lectured at Bristol Polytechnic.

Political career
Cocks contested Bristol West in 1959 and South Gloucestershire in 1964 and 1966. He was Member of Parliament for Bristol South from 1970 until 1987, after being deselected as a candidate in 1986 and replaced by Dawn Primarolo, in a challenge from the left.

During his time in the House of Commons, Cocks served as a Labour whip in government and in opposition, being Chief Whip from 1976 to 1985.

Cocks was created a life peer on 6 October 1987, becoming Baron Cocks of Hartcliffe, of Chinnor in the County of Oxfordshire and served as vice-chairman of the BBC 1993–98.

He also served as Deputy Chairman of the London Docklands Development Corporation. As Government Chief Whip from 1976 to 1979 he had the task of ensuring Government majorities for a minority government.

Personal life and legacy
Cocks married his first wife Janet (d.2021), a nurse, in 1954. The couple had four children, Andrew, Helen, Sarah and David, before separating in 1976. He was married to Valerie Davis from 1979 until his death from a heart attack on 26 March 2001, at the age of 71.

Cocks is a major character in the play This House by James Graham. The play was first staged at the National Theatre in 2011, with Cocks played by Vincent Franklin.

See also 

 Candidate deselection (Labour Party)

References

Sources
 The Times Guide to the House of Commons, Times Newspapers Ltd, 1966, 1983 & 1987
 
 "Obituary: Lord Cocks of Hartcliffe", The Guardian, 27 March 2001

External links
 

|-

|-

1929 births
2001 deaths
Alumni of the University of Bristol
GMB (trade union)-sponsored MPs
Labour Party (UK) MPs for English constituencies
Labour Party (UK) life peers
Members of the Privy Council of the United Kingdom
People educated at George Watson's College
People educated at Silcoates School
Place of death missing
Politicians from Bristol
Politicians from Leeds
UK MPs 1970–1974
UK MPs 1974
UK MPs 1974–1979
UK MPs 1979–1983
UK MPs 1983–1987
Life peers created by Elizabeth II